The International Conference on Sociolinguistics ("ICS") is a biennial academic conference in the field of sociolinguistics. Begun in 2016, the conference has met twice, with the third meeting scheduled for 2020.

Meetings
 ICS.1 "Insights from Complexity, Superdiversity and Multimodality" was held 1 – 3 September, 2016, at Eötvös Loránd University;
 ICS.2 was held 6 – 8 September, 2018, at Eötvös Loránd University;
 ICS.3 "Diversities, New Media and Language Management", will be held 26 – 28 August, 2021, at Charles University

External links

Academic conferences
Sociolinguistics